Marie-Luise Hilger (17 August 1912 – 25 December 1996) was a German lawyer and chair judge at the Federal Labour Court.

Hilger was appointed in 1959 as one of the first women at a supreme court of the federal government to judge at the Federal Labour Court. This was followed in 1973 by her appointment as chairwoman judge at the Federal Labour Court.

References

1912 births
1996 deaths
20th-century German judges
German women judges
Commanders Crosses of the Order of Merit of the Federal Republic of Germany
20th-century women lawyers
20th-century German women
20th-century women judges